K. S. Vijayakumar is a politician from Tamil Nadu, India
. He was elected from the Gummidipundi constituency to the Fifteenth Tamil Nadu Legislative Assembly as a member of the All India Anna Dravida Munnetra Kazhagam political party in the 2016 Tamil Nadu legislative assembly elections.

Electoral performance

References 

Year of birth missing (living people)
Living people
All India Anna Dravida Munnetra Kazhagam politicians
Tamil Nadu MLAs 2016–2021